Oiler may refer to:

Ships
 Replenishment oiler
 Tanker (ship)

Sports
 Cape Breton Oilers, a former American Hockey League team
 City Oilers, Ugandan basketball team
 Edmonton Oilers, a National Hockey League team based in Edmonton, Alberta, Canada
 Espoon Oilers, a Finnish Salibandyliiga floorball team
 Houston Oilers, a former National Football League team (now the Tennessee Titans)
 Southern District Oilers, a division 1 American football team based in Adelaide, Australia
 Stavanger Oilers, an ice hockey team based in Stavanger, Norway
 Tulsa Oilers, an ECHL ice hockey team based in Tulsa, Oklahoma, United States

Other
 Oil can
 Oiler (occupation)
 Oiler (Transformers), a fictional Transformers character
 The Oiler, a character in an 1897 short story "The Open Boat" by Stephen Crane
 Slang for diesel engine

See also
 Euler (disambiguation)